Abū Bakr Aḥmad ibn ʿAlī ibn Thābit ibn Aḥmad ibn Māhdī al-Shāfiʿī, commonly known as al-Khaṭīb al-Baghdādī or "the lecturer from Baghdad" (10 May 1002 – 5 September 1071; 392 AH-463 AH), was a Sunni Muslim scholar known for being one of the foremost leading hadith scholars and historian at his time. He is widely considered an important authority in Hadith, Fiqh and History.

Biography

Early life
Al-Khatib al-Baghdadi was born on 24 Jumadi' al-Thani, 392 A.H/May 10, 1002, in Hanikiya, a village south of Baghdad. He was the son of a preacher and he began studying at an early age with his father and other shaykhs. Over time he studied other sciences but his primary interest was hadith. At the age of 20 his father died and he went to Basra to search for hadith. In 1024 he set out on a second journey to Nishapur and he collected more hadith in Rey, Amol and Isfahan. It is unclear how long he traveled but his own accounts have him back in Baghdad by 1028. While he was an authority on hadith it was his preaching that led to his fame that would help him later in life.  One biographer, Al-Dhahabi, said that contemporary teachers and preachers of tradition would usually submit what they had collected to Al-Baghdadi before they used them in their lectures or sermons.

Teachers
Al-Khatib had a number of teachers but his two main teachers whom he studied both hadith and fiqh by two leading experts named Abu Nu'aym al-Isfahani (one of the best hadith authorities at his time) and Abu Ishaq al-Shirazi (leading fuqaha' at his time).

Students
Al-Khattabi had many students with some becoming renowned scholars and among his famous students:
 Ibn Aqil
 Al-Nasr al-Maqdisi
 Ibn Makula
 Al-Humaydi
 Abu Mansur al-Shaybani
 Abu Ya'la ibn al-Farra'

Damascus
When a rebellion in 1059 led by the Turkish general Basasiri deposed Caliph Al-Qa'im (Abbasid caliph at Baghdad), and deprived Al-Baghdadi of his protection in Baghdad, he left for Damascus and there spent eight years as a lecturer at the Umayyad Mosque until a major controversy erupted.  According to his biographers, Yaqut, Sibt ibn al-Jawzi, al-Dhahabi, as-Safadi, and Ibn Taghribirdi this involved al-Baghdadi's relationship with a youth, who, apparently had travelled with him from Baghdad.  Yaqut relates that when news of the controversy reached the ruler of Damascus, he ordered that al-Baghdadi should be killed.  However the police chief, a Sunni, realizing that to follow the order would lead to a backlash against the Shi'i, warned al-Baghdadi to flee to the protection of Shari ibn Abi al-Hasan al-'Alawi.  Al-Baghdadi spent about a year exiled in Sur, Lebanon before he returned to Baghdad, where he died in September 1071.  He was buried next to Bishr al-Hafi.

Creed
‘Abd al-‘Aziz ibn Ahmad al-Kattani said: "Al-Khatib followed the [doctrinal] school of Abu al-Hasan al-Ash'ari – Allah have mercy on him." Al-Dhahabi replies and comments: "This is true. For al-Khatib explicitly stated, concerning the reports on the Divine Attributes, that they are passed on exactly as they were received, without interpretation." Al-Dhahabi goes on to narrate al-Khatib’s methodology of rejecting nullification (ta‘tîl), figurativeness (ta'wil) and literalism (dhahir) of the divine Attributes:
Abu Bakr al-Khatib said: "As for what pertains to the divine Attributes, whatever is narrated in the books of sound reports concerning them, the position of the Salaf consists in their affirmation and letting them pass according to their external wordings while negating from them modality (kayfiyya) and likeness to things created (tashbîh). A certain people have contradicted the Attributes and nullified what Allah I had affirmed; while another people have declared them real then went beyond this to some kind of likening to creation and ascription of modality. The true objective is none other than to tread a middle path between the two matters. The Religion of Allah lies between the extremist and the laxist. The principle to be followed in this matter is that the discourse on the Attributes is a branch of the discourse on the Essence. The path to follow in the former is the same extreme caution as in the latter. When it is understood that the affirmation of the Lord of the Worlds [in His Essence] is only an affirmation of existence and not of modality, it will be similarly understood that the affirmation of His Attributes is only an affirmation of their existence, not an affirmation of definition (tahdîd) nor an ascription of modality. So when we say: Allah has a Hand, hearing, and sight, they are none other than Attributes Allah has affirmed for Himself. We should not say that the meaning of ‘hand’ is power (al-qudra) nor that the meaning of ‘hearing’ and ‘sight’ is knowledge (‘ilm), nor should we say that they are organs (lâ naqûlu innahâ jawârih)! Nor should we liken them to hands, hearings, and sights that are organs and implements of acts. We should say: All that is obligatory is [1] to affirm them because they are stated according to divine prescription (tawqîf), and [2] to negate from them any likeness to created things according to His saying (There is nothing whatsoever like unto Him) (42:11) (and there is none like Him) (112:4)."

Controversy over al-Baghdadi
Biographers Sibt ibn al-Jawzi, Ibn Kathīr, and Ibn Taghribirdi wrote that the original was a work by as-Suri which al-Baghdādī had extended. Yāqūt al-Ḥamawī attributed the authorship to as-Surī's sister and accused al-Baghdādī of plagiarism, whereas Ibn Kathīr made no accusation of plagiarism, but attributed the original to as-Suri's wife. 

He was accused of being Hanbali then switched to becoming Shafi'i according to Ibn Al-Jawzi, however, early and contemporary historians unanimously agreed that he began his career as a Shafi‘i and was never a Hanbali in his life.

Reception
The Hanbali hadith master, Ibn Aqil said: "Al-Khatib wrote abundantly on the science of hadith and became the undisputed hadith authority in his time." Al-Mu’taman al-Saji said "that the people of Baghdad never saw anyone such as al-Khatib after Al-Daraqutni." Abu ‘Ali al-Baradani said: "It is probable al-Khatib never met his equal." Abu Ishaq al-Isfarayini said: "Al-Khatib is the Daraqutni of our time."

Ali ibn Makula said:

"He was one of the foremost scholars whom we witnessed in his science, precision, memorization, and accuracy in the hadith of the Messenger of Allah. He was an expert in its minute defects, its chains of transmission, its narrators and transmitters, the sound and the rare, the unique and the denounced, the defective and the discarded. The people of Baghdad never had someone comparable to Abu al-Hasan ‘Ali ibn ‘Umar al-Daraqutni after the latter, except al-Khatib."

Al-Dhahabi said:
"The most peerless imam, erudite scholar and mufti, meticulous hadith master, scholar of his time in hadith, prolific author, and seal of the hadith masters."

Works
Ibn Hajar declared his works influential in the field of the Science of hadith and Hadith terminology saying, "Scarce is the discipline from the disciplines of the science of ḥadīth            on which he has not written a book." He then quoted Abu Bakr ibn Nuqtah, a Hanbali scholar, as saying, “Every objective person knows that the scholars of ḥadīth           s coming after al-Khaṭīb            are indebted to his works.” Over 80 titles have been attributed to al-Baghdādī.

Selected list of works.
 History of Baghdad or Madīnat as-Salām ('City of Peace') and Appendix of Scholars - 23 volumes. Considered his most important work.
 al-Kifaya fi ma'rifat usul 'ilm al-riwaya: an early work dealing with Hadith terminology, which Ibn Hajar praised as influential in the field
 al-Djami' li-akhlak al-rawi wa-adab al-sami
 Takyid al-'ilm: Questions whether putting traditions into writing is forbidden
 Sharaf ashab al-hadith: Centers around the significance of traditionalists
 al-Sabik wa 'l-lahik: dealing with hadith narrators of a particular type
 al-Mu'tanif fi takmilat al-Mu'talif wa 'l-mukhtalif: Correct spelling and pronunciation of names
 al-Muttafik wa 'l-muftarik
 Talkhis al-mutashabih fi 'l-rasm wa-himayat ma ashkala minhu min nawadir al-tashif wa 'l-wahm
 al-Asma' al-mubhama fi 'l-anba' al-muhkama: identifying unnamed individuals mentioned in hadith
 al-Rihla fi talab al-hadith
 Iktida' al-'ilm al-'amal

See also 
 List of Ash'aris and Maturidis

References

Source
 

1002 births
1071 deaths
Writers from Baghdad
Sunni Muslim scholars of Islam
Hadith scholars
Shafi'is
Asharis
11th-century Muslim scholars of Islam
11th-century jurists